Francesco Salandria (born 18 April 1995) is an Italian football player. He plays for  club Fidelis Andria.

Club career
He made his Serie B debut for Reggina on 25 May 2014 in a game against Avellino.
On 10 June 2018, he returned to Reggina, signing a two-year deal.

On 24 January 2020 he joined Catania on a 1.5-year contract.

On 16 September 2020 he moved to Viterbese on a 2-year contract.

On 25 August 2021, he joined Lamezia Terme in Serie D.

On 25 January 2023, Salandria returned to Serie C and signed with Fidelis Andria.

References

External links
 

1995 births
People from Trebisacce
Sportspeople from the Province of Cosenza
Footballers from Calabria
Living people
Italian footballers
Italy youth international footballers
Association football midfielders
Reggina 1914 players
S.S. Akragas Città dei Templi players
Matera Calcio players
Catania S.S.D. players
U.S. Viterbese 1908 players
F.C. Lamezia Terme players
Cavese 1919 players
S.S. Fidelis Andria 1928 players
Serie B players
Serie C players
Serie D players